Epithisanotia is a monotypic moth genus of the family Noctuidae erected by Sergius G. Kiriakoff in 1856. Its only species, Epithisanotia sanctaejohannis, was first described by Francis Walker in 1856. It is found in Mexico.

References

Agaristinae
Monotypic moth genera